The Mystery of the Condor Hero is a Hong Kong television series adapted from Louis Cha's novel The Legend of the Condor Heroes. It was first broadcast on TVB Jade in Hong Kong in 1993.

Plot
The story is an unofficial prequel to Louis Cha's novel The Legend of the Condor Heroes. It tells the story of Wong Yeuk-see's early life.

Cast
 Note: Some of the characters' names are in Cantonese romanisation.

 Julian Cheung as Chan Yuen-fung
 John Chiang as Wong Yeuk-see
 Fiona Leung as Fung Hang
 Lau Kong as Hung Tsat-kung
 Wong Wai as Yat-dang
 Liu Kai-chi as Chow Pak-tung
 Emily Kwan as Mui Chiu-fung
 Pau Fong as Sheung-koon Nam
 Kwan Hoi-san as Yan Po-pai
 Maple Hui as Kau Choi-lan
 Yung Hang-lan as Yeung Tsi-yin
 Chu Tit-wo as Kau Chin-yan
 Chan On-ying as Tip Bo-yee
 Cheng Lui as Chiu Bat-fan
 Gordon Liu as Yuen-tsan
 Kong Hon as Wong Chung-yeung
 Koo May-wah as Lau Yung-yuet
 Law Lok-lam as Au-yeung Fung
 Tang Yu-chiu as Fisherman
 Yu Tin-wai as Woodcutter
 Leung Siu-chau as Mou Sam-tung
 Gordon Lam as Chu Tsi-lau
 Derek Kwok as Luk Sing-fung
 Cheung Hoi-kan as Mou Min-fung
 Wong Chun-ning as Fung Mak-fung
 Lee Yiu-king as Kuk Ling-fung
 Mak Tsi-wan as Lam Ping
 Ng Yuk-shu as Sa Ching-fung
 Wan Tai-wah as Kwok Tsi-wah
 Wong Wai-tak as Yau Chiu-kai
 Leung Kin-ping as Ma Yuk
 Wong Wai-leung as Wong Chui-yat
 Wong Wai-lam as Tam Chiu-duen
 Law Wai as Ho Dai-tung
 Cheung Pak-hin as Lau Chiu-yuen
 Lee Kwai-ying as Sun Bat-yee
 Chan Wing-chun as Au-yeung Chun
 How Chun-yu as Au-yeung Hak
 Toi Chi-wai as Yuen-ngan Hung-hei
 Cheung Ying-choi as Yuen-ngan Seut
 Tam Chuen-hing as Yuen-ngan Tsan
 Hung Chiu-fung as Wong Seung
 Siu Chuk-Yiu as Ming Cult elder
 Yu Fung as Island master Pak
 Mak Ho-wai as Island master Hak
 Sun Kwai-hing as Boss
 Lily Liu as Lady boss
 Yau Biu as Foolish kid

External links

TVB dramas
Hong Kong wuxia television series
Television shows based on The Legend of the Condor Heroes
1993 Hong Kong television series debuts
1993 Hong Kong television series endings
Television series set in the Southern Song
Prequel television series
Cantonese-language television shows